Institute of Clinical Dentistry is of the two institutions at the Faculty of Dentistry at the University of Oslo

The institute serves more than 50,000 patients annually, and trains dental assistants, dentists and dental specialists, as well as PhD candidates.

The institute is divided into the following departments: 
 Department of Biomaterials
 Department of Cardiology and gerontology 
 Department of Community dentistry 
 Department of Dental Pharmacology and Pharmacotherapy
 Department of Endodontics
 Department of Maxillofacial Radiology 
 Department of Oral Surgery and Oral Medicine 
 Department of Orthodontics
 Department of Pediatric Dentistry and Behavioural Science 
 Department of Periodontology 
 Department of Prosthodontics

External links 
 Official website

Dentistry in Norway
University of Oslo